Luis Mayoral may also refer to:

 Luis Mayoral (cyclist) (born 1937), Spanish cyclist
 Luis Mayoral (footballer) (born 1947), Spanish footballer